The 2020 Ain municipal elections took place on 15 March 2020, with a second round of voting initially expected for 22 March 2020. Like the rest of France, the second round was initially suspended due to the COVID-19 pandemic. On 22 May, Prime Minister Édouard Philippe announced that the second round of voting would take place on the 28th of June.

Incumbent and elected mayors 
The election was marked by political stability, with the right remaining largely the majority political force in the department. The left, having largely been defeated in 2014, was unable to regain seats lost in Ambérieu-en-Bugey, Attignat, Belley, Ferney-Voltaire, Montluel, Ornex, Prévessin-Moëns, Trévoux and Villars-les-Dombes. In 2020, the left continued its political erosion by losing seats in Miribel and Reyrieux, but was consoled with the re-election of Jean-François Debat (PS) in Bourg-en-Bresse.

Results by number of mayors elected

Results in communes with more than 3,000 inhabitants

Ambérieu-en-Bugey 

 Incumbent mayor: Daniel Fabre (UDI)
 33 seats to be elected to the conseil municipal (population in 2017: 14,035 residents)
 13 seats to be elected to the conseil communautaire (CC de la Plaine de l'Ain)

Arbent 

Incumbent mayor: Liliane Maissiat (LR)
 23 seats to be elected to the conseil municipal (population in 2017: 3,367 residents)
 3 seats to be elected to the conseil communautaire (Haut-Bugey Agglomération)

Attignat 

Incumbent mayor: Walter Martin (DVD)
 23 seats to be elected to the conseil municipal (population in 2017: 3,211 residents)
 2 seats to be elected to the conseil communautaire (CA du Bassin de Bourg-en-Bresse)

Bâgé-Dommartin 

Incumbent mayor: Dominique Repiquet (DVD)
 29 seats to be elected to the conseil municipal (population in 2017: 4,092 residents)
 5 seats to be elected to the conseil communautaire (CC Bresse et Saône)

Béligneux 

Incumbent mayor: Francis Sigoire (DVD)
 23 seats to be elected to the conseil municipal (population in 2017: 3,333 residents)
 4 seats to be elected to the conseil communautaire (CC de la Côtière à Montluel)

Belley 

Incumbent mayor: Pierre Berthet (DVD)
 29 seats to be elected to the conseil municipal (population in 2017: 9,103 residents)
 16 seats to be elected to the conseil communautaire (CC Bugey Sud)

Bellignat 

Incumbent mayor: Jean-Georges Arbant (PS)
 27 seats to be elected to the conseil municipal (population in 2017: 3,624 residents)
 3 seats to be elected to the conseil communautaire (Haut-Bugey Agglomération)

Beynost 

Incumbent mayor: Caroline Terrier (LR)
 27 seats to be elected to the conseil municipal (population in 2017: 4,613 residents)
 6 seats to be elected to the conseil communautaire (CC de Miribel et du Plateau)

Bourg-en-Bresse 

Incumbent mayor: Jean-François Debat (PS)
 43 seats to be elected to the conseil municipal (population in 2017: 41,527 residents)
 31 seats to be elected to the conseil communautaire (CA du Bassin de Bourg-en-Bresse)

Cessy 

Incumbent mayor: Christophe Bouvier (DVD)
 27 seats to be elected to the conseil municipal (population in 2017: 4,856 residents)
 2 seats to be elected to the conseil communautaire (Pays de Gex Agglo)

Ceyzériat 

Incumbent mayor: Jean-Yves Flochon (LR)
 23 seats to be elected to the conseil municipal (population in 2017: 3,157 residents)
 2 seats to be elected to the conseil communautaire (CA du Bassin de Bourg-en-Bresse)

Châtillon-sur-Chalaronne 

Incumbent mayor: Patrick Mathias (DVD)
 27 seats to be elected to the conseil municipal (population in 2017: 4,859 residents)
 7 seats to be elected to the conseil communautaire (CC de la Dombes)

Culoz 

Incumbent mayor: Franck André-Masse (DVD)
 23 seats to be elected to the conseil municipal (population in 2017: 3,035 residents)
 5 seats to be elected to the conseil communautaire (CC Bugey Sud)

Dagneux 

Incumbent mayor: Bernard Simplex (DVD)
 27 seats to be elected to the conseil municipal (population in 2017: 4,717 residents)
 6 seats to be elected to the conseil communautaire (CC de la Côtière à Montluel)

Divonne-les-Baines 

Incumbent mayor: Vincent Scattolin (LR)
 29 seats to be elected to the conseil municipal (population in 2017: 9,644 residents)
 5 seats to be elected to the conseil communautaire (Pays de Gex Agglo)

Feillens 

Incumbent mayor: Guy Billoudet (LR)
 23 seats to be elected to the conseil municipal (population in 2017: 3,291 residents)
 4 seats to be elected to the conseil communautaire (CC Bresse et Saône)

Ferney-Voltaire 

Incumbent mayor: Daniel Raphoz (UDI)
 29 seats to be elected to the conseil municipal (population in 2017: 9,766 residents)
 5 seats to be elected to the conseil communautaire (Pays de Gex Agglo)

Gex 

Incumbent mayor: Patrice Dunand (DVD)
 33 seats to be elected to the conseil municipal (population in 2017: 13,118 residents)
 7 seats to be elected to the conseil communautaire (Pays de Gex Agglo)

Jassans-Riottier 

Incumbent mayor: Jean-Pierre Reverchon (SE)
 29 seats to be elected to the conseil municipal (population in 2017: 6,339 residents)
 5 seats to be elected to the conseil communautaire (CA Villefranche-Beaujolais-Saône)

La Boisse 

Incumbent mayor: François Drogue (DVD)
 23 seats to be elected to the conseil municipal (population in 2017: 3,229 residents)
 4 seats to be elected to the conseil communautaire (CC de la Côtière à Montluel)

Lagnieu 

 Incumbent mayor: André Moingeon (LR)
 29 seats to be elected to the conseil municipal (population in 2017: 7,143 residents)
 6 seats to be elected to the conseil communautaire (CC de la Plaine de l'Ain)

Loyettes 

Incumbent mayor: Jean-Pierre Gagne (DVD)
 23 seats to be elected to the conseil municipal (population in 2017: 3,146 residents)
 3 seats to be elected to the conseil communautaire (CC de la Plaine de l'Ain)

Meximieux 

 Incumbent mayor: Christian Bussy (LR)
 29 seats to be elected to the conseil municipal (population in 2017: 7,743 residents)
 7 seats to be elected to the conseil communautaire (CC de la Plaine de l'Ain)

Miribel 

 Incumbent mayor: Sylvie Viricel (DVG)
 29 seats to be elected to the conseil municipal (population in 2017: 9,963 residents)
 13 seats to be elected to the conseil communautaire (CC de Miribel et du Plateau)

Montluel 

 Incumbent mayor: Romain Daubié (DVD)
 29 seats to be elected to the conseil municipal (population in 2017: 6,964 residents)
 9 seats to be elected to the conseil communautaire (CC de la Côtière à Montluel)

Montmerle-sur-Saône 

Incumbent mayor: Raphaël Lamure (DVD)
 27 seats to be elected to the conseil municipal (population in 2017: 3,793 residents)
 6 seats to be elected to the conseil communautaire (CC Val de Saône Centre)

Montréal-la-Cluse 

Incumbent mayor: Patrick Dufour (DVD)
 23 seats to be elected to the conseil municipal (population in 2017: 3,435 residents)
 3 seats to be elected to the conseil communautaire (Haut-Bugey Agglomération)

Nantua 

Incumbent mayor: Jean-Pierre Carminati (DVD)
 23 seats to be elected to the conseil municipal (population in 2017: 3,446 residents)
 3 seats to be elected to the conseil communautaire (Haut-Bugey Agglomération)

Ornex 

Incumbent mayor: Jean-François Obez (DVD)
 27 seats to be elected to the conseil municipal (population in 2017: 4,410 residents)
 2 seats to be elected to the conseil communautaire (Pays de Gex Agglo)

Oyonnax 

Incumbent mayor: Michel Perraud (UDI)
 35 seats to be elected to the conseil municipal (population in 2017: 22,427 residents)
 24 seats to be elected to the conseil communautaire (Haut-Bugey Agglomération)

Péronnas 

Incumbent mayor: Christian Chanel (DVD)
 29 seats to be elected to the conseil municipal (population in 2017: 6,385 residents)
 4 seats to be elected to the conseil communautaire (CA du Bassin de Bourg-en-Bresse)

Plateau d'Hauteville 

Incumbent mayor: Philippe Emin (LR)
 29 seats to be elected to the conseil municipal (population in 2017: 4,853 residents)
 5 seats to be elected to the conseil communautaire (Haut-Bugey Agglomération)

Prévessin-Moëns 

 Incumbent mayor: Aurélie Charillon (DVD)
 29 seats to be elected to the conseil municipal (population in 2017: 8,233 residents)
 4 seats to be elected to the conseil communautaire (Pays de Gex Agglo)

Replonges 

Incumbent mayor: Bertrand Vernoux (LR)
 27 seats to be elected to the conseil municipal (population in 2017: 3,717 residents)
 5 seats to be elected to the conseil communautaire (CC Bresse et Saône)

Reyrieux 

Incumbent mayor: Jacky Dutruc (DVG)
 27 seats to be elected to the conseil municipal (population in 2017: 4,797 residents)
 5 seats to be elected to the conseil communautaire (CC Dombes-Saône Vallée)

Saint-André-de-Corcy 

Incumbent mayor: Jean-Pierre Baron (LR)
 23 seats to be elected to the conseil municipal (population in 2017: 3,354 residents)
 4 seats to be elected to the conseil communautaire (CC de la Dombes)

Saint-Denis-lès-Bourg 

Incumbent mayor: Guillaume Fauvet (DVG)
 29 seats to be elected to the conseil municipal (population in 2017: 5,747 residents)
 4 seats to be elected to the conseil communautaire (CA du Bassin de Bourg-en-Bresse)

Saint-Genis-Pouilly 

Incumbent mayor: Hubert Bertrand (PRG)
 33 seats to be elected to the conseil municipal (population in 2017: 12,544 residents)
 6 seats to be elected to the conseil communautaire (Pays de Gex Agglo)

Saint-Maurice-de-Beynost 

Incumbent mayor: Pierre Goubet (DVG)
 27 seats to be elected to the conseil municipal (population in 2017: 3,967 residents)
 5 seats to be elected to the conseil communautaire (CC de Miribel et du Plateau)

Thoiry 

Incumbent mayor: Muriel Bénier (DVD)
 29 seats to be elected to the conseil municipal (population in 2017: 6,038 residents)
 3 seats to be elected to the conseil communautaire (Pays de Gex Agglo)

Trévoux 

Incumbent mayor: Marc Péchoux (LR)
 29 seats to be elected to the conseil municipal (population in 2017: 6,845 residents)
 8 seats to be elected to the conseil communautaire (CC Dombes-Saône Vallée)

Valserhône 

Incumbent mayor: Régis Petit (DVD)
 35 seats to be elected to the conseil municipal (population in 2017: 16,423 residents)
 18 seats to be elected to the conseil communautaire (CC du Pays Bellegardien)

Villars-les-Dombes 

Incumbent mayor: Pierre Larrieu (DVD)
 27 seats to be elected to the conseil municipal (population in 2017: 4,795 residents)
 7 seats to be elected to the conseil communautaire (CC de la Dombes)

Villieu-Loyes-Mollon 

Incumbent mayor: Éric Beaufort (DVD)
 27 seats to be elected to the conseil municipal (population in 2017: 3,653 residents)
 3 seats to be elected to the conseil communautaire (CC de la Plaine de l'Ain)

Viriat 

Incumbent mayor: Bernard Perret (DVD)
 29 seats to be elected to the conseil municipal (population in 2017: 6,418 residents)
 4 seats to be elected to the conseil communautaire (CA du Bassin de Bourg-en-Bresse)

Communes without candidates 
In three communes, Buellas, Péron and Point d'Ain no candidates stood for election.

References 

2020 elections in France
2020 municipal elections in France
Elections in Ain